Milan Ludík (born 9 September 1992) is a Czech badminton player.

Personal Life
In August 2020, Ludik married Mauritius' badminton player, Kate Foo Kune.

Achievements

BWF International Challenge/Series (4 titles, 5 runners-up) 
Men's singles

Men's doubles

Mixed doubles

  BWF International Challenge tournament
  BWF International Series tournament
  BWF Future Series tournament

References

External links 
 

1992 births
Living people
Sportspeople from Trenčín
Czech male badminton players
Badminton players at the 2019 European Games
European Games competitors for the Czech Republic
Czech emigrants to Denmark
Czech expatriate sportspeople in Denmark